Petro Petrovych Tolochko (21 February 1938) is a Soviet and Ukrainian historian, archaeologist, and political activist. He is one of the leading specialists in history of the Kievan Rus (Old Rus) and one of leading researchers of the NASU Institute of Archaeology of Ukraine.

Tolochko is a doctor of historical sciences (1981), professor (1982), full member of the National Academy of Sciences of Ukraine (1990), foreign member of the Russian Academy of Sciences (2011) and member of the World Russian People's Council.

References

External links
 Petro Tolochko. Official Ukraine Today.
 Hlib Ivakin. Petro Petrovych Tolochko (ТОЛОЧКО ПЕТРО ПЕТРОВИЧ). Encyclopedia of History of Ukraine.

Ukrainian medievalists
Ukrainian archaeologists
1938 births
Living people
People from Kyiv Oblast
Hromada (political party) politicians
Third convocation members of the Verkhovna Rada
Fourth convocation members of the Verkhovna Rada
Foreign Members of the Russian Academy of Sciences
NASU Institute of Archaeology
Recipients of the Order of Prince Yaroslav the Wise, 3rd class
Recipients of the Order of Prince Yaroslav the Wise, 4th class
Laureates of the State Prize of Ukraine in Science and Technology